The People's Democratic Front (PDF) was a political alliance in Burma.

History
The People's Democratic Front  was formed by left-wing politicians in 1951 in order to oppose the ruling Anti-Fascist People's Freedom League (AFPFL). Its members included the Burma Workers and Peasants Party, the Patriotic Alliance, the Burma Democratic Party and the Burma Trades Union Congress.

The PDF won 19 of the 250 seats in the Chamber of Deputies in the 1951–52 general elections, emerging as the main opposition to the AFPFL, which had won 199 seats. In 1955 it was succeeded by the National United Front alliance.

References

Defunct political party alliances in Myanmar
1951 establishments in Burma
Political parties established in 1951
1955 disestablishments in Burma
Political parties disestablished in 1955